Christoffer Fagerström (born 29 September 1992 in Vänersborg) is a  Swedish bandy player.

Career

Club career
Westh is a youth product of Vargön and represented their senior team before moving to IFK Vänersborg in 2008. With IFK Vänersborg, he won the Swedish Under 20 Championship.

In 2017, he joined Hammarby.

International career
Fagerström was part of Sweden's 2010 Under 19 World Championship winning team at the age of 19. He was also part of the silver medalist team of the 2011 Under 23 World Championship.

References

External links
 
 

1992 births
Living people
People from Vänersborg Municipality
Swedish bandy players
IFK Vänersborg players
Hammarby IF Bandy players
Bollnäs GIF players
Sweden international bandy players
Sportspeople from Västra Götaland County